Mapleton is a Moncton Neighbourhood (former community) located in Moncton, New Brunswick. The community is situated in the Northern area of the city of Moncton. Mapleton is located mainly around the intersection of Route 2 exit 454 and Mapleton Road extending south past Route 15 to the intersection of Route 126.  Mapleton is a mix between commercial, park, and residential area.

History

Places of note

Bordering communities

See also

List of neighbourhoods in Moncton
List of tallest buildings in Moncton

Neighbourhoods in Moncton